This is a list of candidates of the 1941 South Australian state election.

Retiring MPs

Liberal and Country League

 Walter Hannaford MLC (Midland District) – retired
 Hermann Homburg MLC (Central District No. 2) – lost preselection
 Harry Dove Young MLC (Southern District) – retired

Independent

 George Connor (Alexandra) – retired

The seat of Glenelg had remained vacant following the death of incumbent independent MHA William Fisk on 18 December 1940. Stanley Liberal MHA Alexander Melrose switched houses at the election, being elected unopposed for Midland Province.

Legislative Assembly

Sitting members are shown in bold text. Successful candidates are marked with an asterisk.

Legislative Council

References

1941 elections in Australia
Candidates for South Australian state elections
1940s in South Australia